Coniothyrium rosarum is a species of fungus in the family Leptosphaeriaceae.

References

Fungi described in 1882
Fungal plant pathogens and diseases
Pleosporales